Haumuri Bluff (also known as Amuri Bluff) is a headland on the coast of New Zealand's South Island on the south side of Piripaua (Spyglass Point), located several kilometres south of Oaro. It has been a major palaeontological site since the mid-19th century, and has lent its name to the Haumurian stage in the New Zealand geologic time scale. The bluff has also been the site of numerous shipwrecks.

References

Paleontological sites of New Zealand
Headlands of Canterbury, New Zealand
Kaikōura District